Ariam Ala-Ala is a community in Ikwuano Local Government Area of Abia State, Nigeria. It is one of 15 localities of the Ariam/Usaka clan. It is located along the Umuahia-Ikot Ekpene Road and is about 27km away from the state capital, Umuahia.

See also
 Ariam/Usaka

References

Populated places in Abia State